Janina Oyrzanowska-Poplewska (2 May 191816 July 2001) was a Polish academic and veterinarian. A professor at the Warsaw University of Life Sciences, she specialized in epizootiology but her main area of research concerned viral diseases of canines, which led to the development of the first vaccine for canine distemper in Poland.

During World War II, she was involved with Polish resistance, and her family helped a number of refugees. In 1981, she was honored as a Righteous Among the Nations by Yad Vashem for her efforts to save Jews during the Holocaust.

Early life
Janina Róża Oyrzanowska was born on 2 May 1918 in Warsaw, during the German Regency Kingdom of Poland to Maria Elżbieta (née Czarnecka) and Kazimierz Oyrzanowski. Her  were Polish nobles, bore the Junosza coat of arms, and owned the Golebie estate near Pułtusk. She was the great granddaughter of Robert Fryderyk Stichel, the first person to earn a master's degree in Poland in veterinary science. Oyrzanowska completed her high school education in 1936 and began taking courses at the faculty of veterinary medicine at the University of Warsaw. Her studies were interrupted by the German invasion of Poland in September 1939.

Oyrzanowska married the veterinarian Mieczysław Poplewski (1916–1940), who would join the Polish Land Forces at the outset of World War II.

During the war, Oyrzanowska lived with her mother, younger sister Maria, and older brother Kazimierz in an apartment in Warsaw. They also had other apartments in the city and a small summer hut on a piece of land they rented for truck farming in the Czerniaków neighborhood. Her family became involved with the Polish resistance from October 1939, and one of their family apartments hosted an underground printing press and document forgery studio. They helped Jews during the war, including their neighbors, the Linfeld and Sterling families; their gardener, Jerzy Glinicki; and others, including Wiktoria Szczawińska and Franciszka Tusk Scheinwechsler (during the war known as Natalia Obrębka). Maria, who had just completed her secondary education, and Oyrzanowska, who was attending university, grew flowers and vegetables to support the family. They moved the Jews they were helping, hiding them in their various homes, ensuring that each of them survived the war. Her family also offered hiding places to other refugees, including escaped Soviet prisoners of war. For their efforts, her sister Maria was arrested by the Germans in 1942 and from March to September that year was incarcerated in the Pawiak Prison. Eventually, the family escaped Warsaw in the latter stages of the Warsaw Uprising.

Career
Following the end of the war, Oyrzanowska studied at the Maria Curie-Skłodowska University in Lublin before returning to the reopened Warsaw University, where she received her degree as a doctor of veterinary studies in 1950. She was working in a professional capacity from 1947. In 1960 she received a PhD degree, and in 1967, she did her habilitation. In 1978 she received the title of associate professor (profesor nadzwyczajny) at the Warsaw University of Life Sciences.

Her work resulted in the development and production of the first Polish vaccine for canine distemper. She also conducted research to determine the necessary dosage for preventive vaccination against rabies. Other notable research by her concerned the topics of the pseudorabies, as well as of the bovine alphaherpesvirus 1.

Oyrzanowska was a co-author of a textbook Choroby mięsożernych zwierząt futerkowych (Diseases of carnivorous fur animals).

In 1980, Oyrzanowska, along with other academics joined in the founding of the Independent Self-Governing Trade Union of Science, Technology and Education Workers (NSZZ PNTiO). At their first meeting, they agreed to join their trade union with Solidarity in an effort to push forward the democratization process.

Based on the account of Franciszka Tusk Scheinwechsler, on 6 June 1981, Oyrzanowska and her sister, Maria, were recognized by Yad Vashem as Righteous Among the Nations.

Death and legacy
 Oyrzanowska died on 16 July 2001 in Warsaw and was buried in the Powązki Cemetery.

Selected works

References

Citations

Bibliography

 
 
 
 
 
 
 
 
 
 

1918 births
2001 deaths
20th-century Polish scientists
20th-century women scientists
Burials at Powązki Cemetery
Knights of the Order of Polonia Restituta
Maria Curie-Skłodowska University alumni
Physicians from Warsaw
Polish medical researchers
Polish resistance members of World War II
Polish Righteous Among the Nations
Polish veterinarians
Polish women scientists
Recipients of the Gold Cross of Merit (Poland)
University of Warsaw alumni
Academic staff of the Warsaw University of Life Sciences
Women medical researchers
20th-century Polish women